Torsten Persson (born 18 April 1954) is a Swedish economist who is the Swedish Research Council Distinguished Professor at the Institute for International Economic Studies, Stockholm University and Centennial Professor of Economics at the London School of Economics.

He has collaborated extensively with Guido Tabellini and Tim Besley on political economy.

Persson is a past director of the Institute for International Economic Studies, president of the European Economic Association, a member of The Royal Swedish Academy of Sciences, and serves on The Prize Committee for the Alfred Nobel Memorial Prize in Economic Sciences.

He is a member of the council for the Lindau Nobel Laureate Meetings.

For 2022 he was awarded the BBVA Foundation Frontiers of Knowledge Award.

Work
 Political Economics – Explaining Economic Policy (with Guido Tabellini), MIT Press, 2000.
 The Economic Effects of Constitutions (with Guido Tabellini), MIT Press 2003.

References

External links
 Torsten Persson's website

1954 births
Living people
20th-century  Swedish  economists
21st-century  Swedish economists
Academic staff of Stockholm University
Members of the Royal Swedish Academy of Sciences
Presidents of the Econometric Society
Fellows of the Econometric Society
Fellows of the American Academy of Arts and Sciences
Corresponding Fellows of the British Academy